Hydraeomyces is a genus of fungi in the family Laboulbeniaceae. The genus contain xx species.

References

External links
Hydraeomyces at Index Fungorum

Laboulbeniaceae
Laboulbeniales genera